The 1968 Illinois gubernatorial election was held in Illinois on November 5, 1968. Democratic nominee, incumbent governor Samuel H. Shapiro (who had assumed the governorship in May 1968, after Otto Kerner Jr. resigned in order to accept a judicial appointment), lost reelection to Republican nominee Richard B. Ogilvie, who was the president of the Cook County Board of Commissioners and former sheriff of Cook County.

Election information
The election coincided with those for federal offices (United States President, Senate, and House) and those for other state offices. The election was part of the 1968 Illinois elections.

The primaries were held on June 11, 1968.

Turnout
In the primary, turnout was 24.44% with 1,332,832 votes cast.

In the general election, turnout was 79.39% with 4,506,000 votes cast.

Democratic primary 
Governor Samuel H. Shapiro won renomination without opposition.

Republican primary 
Ogilvie won the nomination against 1964 lieutenant gubernatorial candidate John Henry Altorfer, former Governor William G. Stratton, and S. Thomas Sutton.

Candidates
John Henry Altorfer, 1964 lieutenant gubernatorial candidate
Richard B. Ogilvie, president of the Cook County Board of Commissioners and former sheriff of Cook County
William G. Stratton, former governor of Illinois
S. Thomas Sutton

Results

General election 
Ogilive won 83 of the state's 102 counties. However, among the 19 counties Shapiro won was the state's most populous, Cook County.

References 

1968
Gubernatorial
Illinois